Emamzadeh Abdollah (also Romanized as Emāmzādeh ‘Abdollāh and Imāmzādeh ‘Abdullāh) is a village in Hafdar Rural District, in the Central District of Sorkheh County, Semnan Province, Iran. At the 2006 census, its population was 53, in 28 families.

References 

Populated places in Sorkheh County